Pelageya Fedorovna Shajn, née Sannikova (Пелагея Фёдоровна Шайн) (22 September 1894 – 27 August 1956), was a Russian astronomer in the Soviet Union, and the first woman credited with the discovery of a minor planet, at the Simeiz Observatory in 1928. Pelageya also discovered numerous variable stars and co-discovered the periodic, Jupiter-family comet 61P/Shajn–Schaldach. She was married to prominent Soviet astronomer Grigory Shajn.

Biography 

Pelageya Shajn was born in 1894 to a peasant family in the village Ostanin located in the Solikamsky District of the Perm Governorate. She was the wife of prominent Soviet astronomer Grigory Shajn, who was also her colleague at the Simeiz Observatory. Her maiden name was Sannikova (Санникова). In 1928, she discovered the asteroid 1112 Polonia, the first minor planet to be discovered by a woman.

She died 27 August 1956, shortly after her husband had died on 4 August the same year.

Awards and honors 

Main-belt asteroid 1190 Pelagia, discovered in 1930 by Grigory Neujmin who worked at Simeiz, was named in her honor. In addition the asteroid 1648 Shajna was named in her and her husband's memory, while the lunar crater Shayn was exclusively named after her husband.

Discoveries 

Her astronomical discoveries are credited under the name P. F. Shajn. As with her husband, her last name, "Shajn", is sometimes given as "Schajn", "Shain" or "Shayn", the latter being the modern English transliteration.

Pelageya Shajn discovered 19 minor planets (see list below) and about 140 variable stars. In 1949, she also co-discovered 61P/Shajn–Schaldach, a periodic comet of the Jupiter family. However, the non-periodic comet C/1925 F1 (Shajn-Comas Solá; also known as Comet 1925 VI or Comet 1925a) was co-discovered by her husband rather than by her.

List of discovered minor planets

See also

References

Further reading 
 Мишланова Л. Самостоянье (Mishlanova L. Samostoyaniya): "Очерки о людях науки и культуры Пермского края. Пермь" (Essays of men on science and culture of Perm Krai). Пушка, 2006. 320 с.: ил., Из содерж.: Планета Пелагея (Planet Pelagia). С. 27-33.: фот.

1894 births
1956 deaths
Soviet women scientists
Discoverers of asteroids
Discoverers of comets

People from Perm Krai
Soviet astronomers
Women astronomers